Joshua Alan Hall (born December 16, 1980 in Lynchburg, Virginia) is an American former Major League Baseball starting pitcher. He has played in Major League Baseball for the Cincinnati Reds in 2003.

Hall was drafted by the Cincinnati Reds in the 7th round of the 1998 Major League Baseball draft. He went 11-5 with a 2.66 ERA and 122 strikeouts. He made his major league debut against the San Francisco Giants on August 2, 2003, as a spot starter going 5 innings, giving up 2 earned runs, and getting a no-decision. Hall missed the entire  season due to an injury and began  back in the minors. First at High-A Sarasota, he was then promoted to Double-A Chattanooga where he had a 3.53 ERA.

Hall became a free agent after the  season and signed with the Washington Nationals on November 6, 2006. After 7 games, he was released by the Nationals and signed a minor league contract with the Colorado Rockies. With Colorado, he split the rest of the season with Double-A Tulsa and Triple-A Colorado Springs. He became a free agent at the end of the season and re-signed with the Rockies in January . Hall was released by the Colorado Rockies at the end of Spring training. On May 11,  Hall agreed to a minor league deal with the Mariners. He declared free agency in November of that year.

References

External links

1980 births
Living people
Cincinnati Reds players
Baseball players from Virginia
Major League Baseball pitchers
Dayton Dragons players
Stockton Ports players
Chattanooga Lookouts players
Louisville Bats players
Harrisburg Senators players
Columbus Clippers players
Tulsa Drillers players
Colorado Springs Sky Sox players
Arizona League Mariners players
Tacoma Rainiers players
Lancaster Barnstormers players
Sportspeople from Lynchburg, Virginia